The 2013 San Martin Jilotepeque bus disaster occurred in San Martin Jilotepeque, Guatemala on Monday September 9, 2013, at 7:50 local time. A passenger bus from Transportes Sanmartineca carrying more than 80 passengers crashed into a 200-meter ravine after missing a sharp bend in the road connecting San Martin Jilotepeque to Chimaltenango. 48 people died and another 37 were wounded in the accident.

See also
 2008 Villa Canales bus disaster

References

Bus incidents in Guatemala
San Martin Jilotepeque bus disaster
2013 in Guatemala
Chimaltenango Department
September 2013 events in North America